YSI may refer to:

YouSendIt, an online site providing sending of large files
Young Social Innovators, a project-based competition for schools in the Republic of Ireland
Youth Science Ireland, formerly IAYSG (Irish Association of Youth Science Groups)
YSI Inc., a brand of sensors and software for Xylem, Inc.
YSi, a silicide composed of yttrium and silicon
Parry Sound/Frying Pan Island-Sans Souci Water Aerodrome (IATA code: YSI), a Canadian airport
YSI Includes created by Y_Less for SA-MP, a multiplayer modification of GTA Sanandreas.